Dode is a village in Jalandhar. Jalandhar is a district in the Indian state of Punjab. It lies on the Kartarpur-Kala Bakra road which is almost 1 km away from it. The nearest railway station to Dode is Kala Bakra railway station at a distance of 4 km.

Post office 
Dode's post office is Mustafapur.

References 

 Official website of Punjab Govt. with Dode's details

Villages in Jalandhar district